Strunino is the name of several inhabited localities in Russia.

Urban localities
Strunino, Vladimir Oblast, a town in Alexandrovsky District of Vladimir Oblast

Rural localities
Strunino, Leningrad Oblast, a village in Tsvylevskoye Settlement Municipal Formation of Tikhvinsky District in Leningrad Oblast
Strunino, Tula Oblast, a village in Revyakinskaya Rural Territory of Yasnogorsky District in Tula Oblast